The 1994 NAIA World Series was the 38th annual tournament hosted by the National Association of Intercollegiate Athletics to determine the national champion of baseball among its member colleges and universities in the United States and Canada.

The tournament was played for a third and final time at Sec Taylor Stadium in Des Moines, Iowa.

Kennesaw State (48–14) defeated Southeastern Oklahoma State (50–15) in a single-game championship series, 2–0, to win the Owls' first NAIA World Series. It was also Southeastern's second consecutive loss in the NAIA World Series finals. 

Kennesaw State pitcher Todd Kirby was named tournament MVP.

Bracket

Preliminary

Championship

See also
 1994 NCAA Division I baseball tournament
 1994 NCAA Division II baseball tournament
 1994 NCAA Division III baseball tournament
 1994 NAIA Softball World Series

Reference

|NAIA World Series
NAIA World Series
NAIA World Series
NAIA World Series